Anundshög (also Anundshögen and Anunds hög) is a tumulus near Västerås in Västmanland, the largest in Sweden.

Assessments of the era of the mound vary between the Bronze Age and the late Iron Age. A fireplace under it has been dated by radiocarbon dating to sometime between AD 210 and 540.

Some historians have associated the mound with the legendary King Anund, while others regard this as speculative. It is purported also that the name is taken from the large runestone at the site, (Vs 13) the central stone in a row of 15 alongside the mound, re-erected in the 1960s and apparently marking out the route of the Eriksgata. The inscription on the runestone reads:
 + fulkuiþr + raisti + stainn + þasi + ala + at + sun + + sin + hiþin + bruþur + anutaʀ + uraiþr hik + runaʀ
 "Folkvid raised all of these stones after his son Heden, Anund's brother. Vred carved the runes."

The site was a thing-place and the ship settings may be associated with this function.

References

External links

Anundshög homepage
Jouni Tervalampi, Anundshög, utanför Västerås, Västmanland 
Anunds mäktiga gravhög, Vikingarnas landskap, Fotevikens Museum 
Anundshögen, Runstenar i Sverige, Swedish National Heritage Board 

Archaeological sites in Sweden
Västmanland
Kurgans
Germanic archaeological artifacts
Geography of Västmanland County
Buildings and structures in Västmanland County
Tourist attractions in Västmanland County